Translating the Name is the debut EP by American  rock band Saosin, released on June 17, 2003 through Death Do Us Part. The album was released before Anthony Green departed the band to form the rock band Circa Survive (though Green would later return on Saosin's 2016 album, Along the Shadow). It is also the band's only release to feature bass guitarist Zack Kennedy, as well as the only release to not feature drummer Alex Rodriguez. Guitarist Beau Burchell stated that Rodriguez intended to track the drums for Translating the Name but had a prior commitment with his former band  Open Hand before he could join. Pat Magrath was hired as a session musician and performed with Saosin briefly before Rodriguez joined.

Translating the Name has been noted as one of the most influential and structured post-hardcore releases of the 2000s.

Release

Translating the Name was released on June 17, 2003 through the label Death Do Us Part. A bonus disc, featuring exclusive acoustic demos, was shipped with early pre-orders.

A limited vinyl release was sold to attendees of the band’s October 2022 tour.

Reception

Translating the Name was reviewed as "excellent", with a rating of 4 out of 5 stars, by Sputnik Music.

Track listing

Charts

Personnel 
 Saosin
 Anthony Green - lead vocals, additional guitars
 Justin Shekoski - guitar, backing vocals
 Beau Burchell - guitar, programming, backing vocals
 Zach Kennedy - bass

 Additional personnel
 Pat Magrath - drums, percussion

 Production
 Beau Burchell - producer, engineer, mixer

References

Saosin albums
2003 EPs